Edward H. Gray was an American tennis player active in the late 19th century.

Gray reached the semifinals of the first two U.S. National Championships in 1881 and 1882. He also reached the semifinals of the 1880 Championships of America.

External links 

American male tennis players
Year of birth missing
Year of death missing